Diosdado Posadas (December 25, 1906 - July 2, 1990), better known as Speedy Dado, was a Filipino boxer who contended for the world flyweight, bantamweight, and featherweight championships.   His managers included Frank Churchill, and Jesus Cortez.

Boxing career
Dado was born Diosdado B. Posadas in Manila on December 25, 1906.  In an era when Asian boxers would often be referred to only by their nationality, he took the last two syllables of his birth name to use in the ring.  In his career, he would be a top-rated contender for world titles in three separate weight divisions, and fight championship matches in each weight class.

World Fly title attempt, April, 1928
He began his boxing career in 1926. Winning nearly all of his early bouts, he lost his first against Newsboy Brown on April 24, 1928, for the California version of the world flyweight title. Brown defeated him by technical knockout due to Dado's shoulder injury in the sixth round.   The fighting was back and forth until the sixth, when Dado, taking a beating, suffered a dislocated shoulder. He met Brown twice more, winning one fight and losing the other.

On February 10, 1931, Dado defeated Newsboy Brown at the Olympic Auditorium in Los Angeles for the vacant USA California State bantamweight championship.  Dado took six rounds with Brown only one, and the rest were even.

Reigning world bantamweight champion Panama Al Brown fell to Dado in a non-title ten-round decision on January 4, 1932, at Olympic Auditorium in Los Angeles.  Showing great speed, Dado won convincingly, according to the Los Angeles Times, taking nine rounds to only the fourth for Brown.  In the seventh, Dado unleashed a fury of punches that had Brown groggy.  The San Francisco Examiner gave Dado only six rounds, but agreed Dado's win was decisive.  Despite a six-inch disadvantage in height, and a significantly shorter reach, Dado had the speed to get close.

On November 15, 1932, Dado defeated Rodolfo Casanova in a well publicized main bout before 10,000 at the Olympic Auditorium in Los Angeles. Dado floored Casanova twice in the first round, once for counts of seven and five, but Casanova fought back and appeared to take the second.  The Los Angeles Times gave four rounds to Dado, with the fourth, sixth and tenth to Casanova, with three even.

Dado fought for world titles on three other occasions, losing both of them. He lost a ten-round points decision in Los Angeles on January 25, 1933, to Baby Arizmendi for the California version of the world featherweight title.  Arizmendi, in a clear victory, was credited with five rounds to only one for his Filipino challenger.  Arizmendi handily took the fifth through seventh rounds.  In their two previous bouts, each boxer had won once.

Dado defeated Baby Palmore on March 10, 1933, in a ten-round points decision in Hollywood.  In a convincing victory, the Los Angeles Times wrote that Dado won all but the fourth round.  The fifth started with Palmore clipping Dado with three strong rights to the chin that left him reeling, but Dado retaliated getting Palmore against the ropes, and continued to take the lead in the sixth through tenth.  Earth tremors occurred during the bout.  In a previous meeting at Hollywood Stadium with Palmore on February 10, 1933, Dado had been embarrassed by a first-round knockout from a short overhand right to the jaw, 1:15 into the first round.

Attempt at world feather title, March, 1933
He lost on March 21, 1933, to Freddie Miller for the National Boxing Association featherweight title at the Olympic Stadium in Los Angeles.  Miller won seven of the ten rounds, and had Dado on the floor for a six count from a strong right to the head in the second round.  Dado took only rounds three and seven.

In a widely publicized bout on June 9, 1933, Dado drew with former Canadian bantamweight champion Pete Sanstol in a ten-round points decision at Dreamland in San Francisco. Both boxers boxed cautiously in the tame bout, though Sanstol appeared the aggressor.  Several local papers wrote that Dado may have had a very slight edge in points.

On October 24, 1933, Dado defeated Young Tommy, another Filipino boxer, in a ten-round points decision at Olympic Auditorium in Los Angeles for the USA California State Bantamweight title. The crowd of 7,000 saw Dado use somewhat better defensive skills, and greater speed, though Tommy may have delivered the stronger blows at times.  In a close bout, Dado took five rounds, Tommy four, and one was even.  On May 19, 1933, Young Tommy won the state title against Dado in a ten-round points decision at Dreamland Auditorium in San Francisco.  In a previous bout on October 12, 1932, Dado decisively defeated Young Tommy for the state bantamweight title in a ten-round points decision in Oakland.  Dado took seven of the ten rounds, and showed great speed in the victory before a capacity crowd. Midway in the second, Tommy was down for a no-count from a left hook to the jaw.  The final round was continuous action, and fought at great speed.  Tommy would later defeat Dado in a ten-round non-title bout in Los Angeles on December 4, 1934.

Boxing in Australia, 1934
Dado fought three high-profile bouts through the summer of 1934 in Australia.  He lost to Merv Darky Blandon, Australian bantamweight champion, in a fifteen-round points decision on April 11, 1934, at Sydney Stadium.  Blandon's right hand proved too much for Dado whose careful boxing was not enough to take the decision.  On April 24, 1934, Dado lost again to Blandon in a close bout at Sydney Stadium before an impressive crowd of 12,000.  Blandon took the offense more frequently and scored with straight lefts and right swings at many points in the match.  Dado also scored with lefts to the body, with fierce attacks throughout the bout, but showed more caution when getting in close.  A cut near Dato's right eye in the twelfth may have affected his boxing in the late rounds.  On June 2, 1934, Dado could not continue boxing in the seventh round after tearing an ankle ligament after a collision with the referee, losing his bout with future Australian bantamweight champion Mickey Miller in Melbourne, Australia.  Miller appeared to have a comfortable margin in points prior to the collision.  Dado was rated in the top five among bantamweights in the world at the time.      
 
Dado successfully defended his USA California State bantamweight title on September 28, 1934, in a close and furious ten round points decision against Joe Tei Ken in San Francisco.  Two furious spurts in the ninth and tenth rounds finally sealed the decision in Dado's favor.  The Reno Gazette  gave Dado six rounds in the close bout with only three to Dado.  With the slightest reach advantage, Dado seemed to have the upper hand at close quarters fighting.  In a match one week earlier, Dado had been disqualified in the third round for dropping to the canvas, and then immediately dropping to one knee after arising.  Dado had won in two previous matches between the two.

Dado defeated future bantamweight champion Lou Salica on October 19, 1934, in a ten-round points decision before a full house at Legion Stadium in Hollywood.  Dado took the offense in most of the contest and fought with his characteristic speed, but seemed to coast after the first thirty seconds of several rounds, exhibiting reduced endurance from his earlier years.  The San Francisco Examiner gave Dado six rounds, Salica three, and one even.

World bantam title attempt, May, 1935
Before a significant crowd of 10,400, Dado lost a May 21, 1935 fight against Pablo Dano for the California and New York version of the bantamweight world title.  Dano was particularly effective in delivering blows to the body and stomach of his opponent, and took the offensive in the fighting from the early rounds.  He scored a no-count knockdown in the second round.  Dano was given recognition by the National Boxing Assocication if he would box Pablo Escobar, so the same recognition may have been given to Dado had he won, granting him his only widely recognized world title.  The loss relegated Dado to secondary status as a boxer.  At 28, with fifteen years of boxing behind him, Dado had taken too much pounding to stay a top rated competitor.

Although he never won a world title, he defeated two champions and drew with reigning world flyweight champion Midget Wolgast.   Dado lost to Wolgast in two other meetings.

Retirement
Dado retired from boxing in 1940 after a fifth-round technical knockout loss to Juan Zurita on July 21 in Guadalajara, Mexico.  Zurita would meet several of America's top boxers in his later career and hold the world lightweight title in 1944, after taking it from Sammy Angott.

Life after boxing
After retiring from boxing, Dado had surgery to remove one of his eyes in 1941, likely a result of injuries sustained from his boxing career.

He worked for a period as a chauffeur for actress Mae West in Los Angeles, as had several other high-profile boxers.

According to a widely distributed UP press report of February 23, 1943, Dado was shot and wounded at a Los Angeles area cafe, following an altercation with 36-year old special policeman Clyde Vickers. Dado had confronted Vickers about why he was carrying a gun, and was shot while attempting to take the 45 caliber firearm from him.  Dado's initial condition was listed as "critical" and emergency surgery was required to remove the bullet from his abdomen. Dado faced several arrests for drinking in his later years in Los Angeles.

In 1946, he worked for a time selling boxing programs at fights and continued to sell boxing magazines for a meager salary at the Olympic Auditorium in Los Angeles through at least 1960.

He died on July 2, 1990, in Manila, Philippines at the age of 83.

References

External links

1906 births
1990 deaths
Featherweight boxers
Bantamweight boxers
Filipino male boxers
Sportspeople from Manila
Boxers from Metro Manila